Darantasia cuneiplena is a moth of the family Erebidae first described by Francis Walker in 1859. It is found in Sundaland and the Philippines. The habitat consists of lowland forests.

References

Nudariina
Moths described in 1859